The Afroasiatic languages (or Afro-Asiatic), also known as Hamito-Semitic,or Semito-Hamitic, and sometimes also as Afrasian, are a language family of about 300 languages that are spoken predominantly in the geographic subregions of Western Asia, North Africa, the Horn of Africa, and parts of the Sahara/Sahel. With the exception of its Semitic branch, all branches of the Afroasiatic family are exclusively native to the African continent.

Afroasiatic languages have over 500 million native speakers, which is the fourth-largest number of native speakers of any language family (after Indo-European, Sino-Tibetan, and Niger–Congo). The phylum has six branches: Berber, Chadic, Cushitic, Egyptian, Semitic, and Omotic. The most widely spoken modern Afroasiatic language or dialect continuum by far is Arabic, a de facto group of distinct language varieties within the Semitic branch. The languages that evolved from Proto-Arabic have around 313 million native speakers, concentrated primarily in the Middle East and North Africa.

In addition to the languages spoken today, Afroasiatic includes many ancient languages, such as Egyptian, which forms a distinct branch of the family; and within the Semitic family, Akkadian, Hebrew, Phoenician, other Canaanite languages, Amorite, Ugaritic and Aramaic. While there is no consensus among historical linguists concerning the original homeland of the Afroasiatic family or the period when the parent language (i.e. Proto-Afroasiatic) was spoken, most agree that it was located within a region of Northeast Africa. Proposed specific locations include the Horn of Africa, Egypt, the eastern Sahara, and the Levant.

Name
In current scholarship, the most common names used for the family are Afroasiatic (or Afro-Asiatic), Hamito-Semitic, and Semito-Hamitic., with the latter two having fallen out of favor in English but still seeing frequent usage in other languages, such as German. Other proposed names which have not found widespread acceptance among the linguistic community include Erythraic, Lisramic, Noahitic, and Lamekhite.

Friedrich Müller introduced the name "Hamito-Semitic" to describe the family in his , published in 1876. Each component of this term was derived from the name of a Biblical son of Noah as detailed in the Book of Genesis: Semitic from his first-born son Shem, and Hamitic from his second son Ham. Each of Noah's sons was traditionally presented as being the common ancestor of several apparently-related people groups, with Shem understood by the original audience as being the common ancestor of the Jews, Assyrians, and Arameans, among others, and Ham seen as the ancestor of the Egyptians and Cushites. This original biblical genealogy reflected political rather than linguistic realities: thus the Canaanites are descendants of Ham, although their language is closely related to Hebrew, and the Elamites are descendants of Shem, although their language is not related to Hebrew at all.

The term Semitic had already been coined in 1781 by August Ludwig von Schlözer, following an earlier suggestion by Gottfried Wilhelm Leibniz in 1710. Hamitic was coined by Ernest Renan in 1855, to refer to languages that seemed similar to the Semitic languages, but were not themselves provably a part of the family. The association between Africans and the Biblical Ham dates back to at least Isidore of Seville (6th century CE), and earlier 19th-century scholars had vaguely spoken of "Hamian" or "Hamitish" languages. Several issues with the label "Hamito-Semitic" have led to its decline in use by later scholars. For example, the Hamitic component inaccurately suggests the existence of a monophyletic "Hamitic" branch alongside Semitic. Additionally, Joseph Greenberg argued that "Hamitic" has racial connotations, and that the name "Hamito-Semitic" overstates the centrality of the Semitic languages within the family. Victor Porkhomovsky suggests that the label "Hamito-Semitic" is at this point simply convention and no more implies an opposition between Semitic and "Hamitic" languages than "Indo-European" implies a "European" and an Indic branch.

Greenberg reintroduced the name "Afroasiatic" in 1960, a name seemingly coined by Maurice Delafosse (as French ) in 1914. The name refers to the fact that this is the only major language family with members in both Africa and Asia. Because the term "Afroasiatic" could be taken to mean that the family includes all the languages of Africa and Asia, the term "Afrasian" is sometimes used instead; this name was proposed by Igor Diakonoff (1980) and is mostly used by Russian scholars.

The alternative name "Lisramic" is based on the AA root *lis- ("tongue") and the Egyptian word rmṯ ("person").

Distribution and branches
Scholars generally consider Afroasiatic to have at least five and as many as eight separate branches, with the five universally agreed upon branches consisting of the Berber (also called "Libyco-Berber"), Chadic, Cushitic, Egyptian, and Semitic. Additionally, a majority of specialists consider the Omotic languages to constitute a sixth branch.

Berber

The Berber (or Libyco-Berber) languages are spoken today by perhaps 16 million people. They are often considered to constitute a single language with multiple dialects. Other scholars, however, argue that they are a group of around twelve languages, about as different from each other as the Romance or Germanic languages. In the past, Berber languages were spoken throughout North Africa except in Egypt; since the 7th century CE, however, they have been heavily affected by Arabic and have been replaced by it in many places.

There are two  extinct languages potentially related to modern Berber. The first is the Numidian language, represented by over a thousand short inscriptions in the Libyco-Berber alphabet, found throughout North Africa and dating from the 2nd century BCE onward. The second is the Guanche language, which was formerly spoken on the Canary Islands and went extinct in the 17th century CE. The first longer written examples of modern Berber varieties only date from the 16th or 17th centuries CE.

Chadic

Chadic languages number between 150 and 190, making Chadic the largest family in Afroasiatic. The Chadic languages are typically divided into three major branches, East Chadic, Central Chadic, and West Chadic. Most Chadic languages are located in the Chad basin, with the exception of Hausa. Hausa is the largest Chadic language by native speakers, and is spoken by a large number of people as a lingua franca in Northern Nigeria. It may have as many as 80 to 100 million first and second language speakers. Eight other Chadic languages have around 100,000 speakers; other Chadic languages often have few speakers and may be endangered of going extinct. Only about 40 Chadic languages have been fully described by linguists.

Cushitic

There are about 30, Cushitic languages, more if Omotic is included, spoken around the Horn of Africa and in Sudan and Tanzania. The Cushitic family is traditionally split into four branches: the single language of Beja (c. 3 million speakers), the Agaw languages, Eastern Cushitic, and Southern Cushitic. Only one Cushitic language, Oromo, has more than 25 million speakers; other languages with more than a million speakers include Somali, Saho-Afar, Hadiyya, and Sidaama. Many Cushitic languages have relatively few speakers. Cushitic does not appear to be related to the written ancient languages known from its area, Meroitic or Old Nubian. The oldest text in a Cushitic language probably dates from around 1770; written orthographies were only developed for a select number of Cushitic languages in early 20th century.

Egyptian

The Egyptian branch consists of a single language, Ancient Egyptian, which was historically spoken in the lower Nile Valley. Egyptian is first attested in writing around 3000 BCE and finally went extinct around 1300 CE, making it the language with the longest written history in the world. Egyptian is usually divided into two major periods, Earlier Egyptian (c. 3000-1300 BCE), which is further subdivided into Old Egyptian and Middle Egyptian, and Later Egyptian (1300 BCE-1300 CE), which is further subdivided into Late Egyptian, Demotic, and Coptic. Coptic is the only stage written alphabetically to show vowels, whereas Egyptian was previously written in Egyptian hieroglyphs, which only represent consonants. In the Coptic period, there is evidence for six major dialects, which presumably existed previously but are obscured by pre-Coptic writing; additionally, Middle Egyptian appears to be based on a different dialect than Old Egyptian, which in turn shows dialectal similarities to Late Egyptian. Egyptian was replaced by Arabic as the spoken language of Egypt, but Coptic continues to be the liturgical language of the Coptic Orthodox Church.

Omotic

The c. 30 Omotic languages are still mostly undescribed by linguists. They are all spoken in southwest Ethiopia except for the Ganza language, spoken in Sudan. Omotic is typically split into North Omotic (or Aroid) and South Omotic, with the latter more influenced by the Nilotic languages; it is unclear whether the Dizoid group of Omotic languages belongs to the Northern or Southern group. The two Omotic languages with the most speakers are Wolaitta and Gamo-Gofa-Dawro, with about 1.2 million speakers each.

A majority of specialists consider Omotic to constitute a sixth branch of Afroasiatic. Omotic was formerly considered part of the Cushitic branch; some scholars continue to consider it part of Cushitic. Other scholars have questioned whether it is Afroasiatic at all, due its lack of several typical aspects of Afroasiatic morphology.

Semitic

There are between 40 and 80 languages in the Semitic family. Today, Semitic languages are spoken across North Africa, Western Asia, and the Horn of Africa, as well as on the island of Malta, making them the sole Afroasiatic branch with members originating outside Africa. Arabic, spoken in both Asia and Africa, has around 300 million native speakers, while the Ethiopian Amharic has around 25 million.

Most authorities divide Semitic into two branches: East Semitic, which includes the extinct Akkadian language and West Semitic, which includes Arabic, Aramaic, the Canaanite languages, including Hebrew, as well as the Ethiopian Semitic languages such as Ge'ez and Amharic. The classification within West Semitic remains contested. The only group with an African origin is Ethiopian Semitic.  The oldest written attestations of Semitic languages come from Mesopotamia, Northern Syria, and Egypt and date as early as c. 3000 BCE.

Other proposed branches
There there are also other proposed branches, but none has so far convinced a majority of scholars:
 Linguist H. Fleming proposed that the near-extinct Ongota language is a separate branch of Afroasiatic; however, this is only one of several competing theories. About half of current scholarly hypotheses on Ongota's origins align it with Afroasiatic in some way.
 Robert Hetzron proposed that the Beja is not part of Cushitic, but a separate branch. The prevailing opinion, however, is that Beja is a branch of Cushitic.
 The extinct Meroitic language has been proposed to represent a branch of Afroasiatic. Although an Afroasiatic connection is sometimes viewed as refuted, it continues to be defended by scholars such as Edward Lipiński.
 The Kujarge language is usually considered part of the Chadic languages; however, Roger Blench has proposed that it may be a separate branch of Afroasiatic.

Subgrouping 

There is no agreement on the relationships between and subgrouping of the different Afroasiatic branches. Whereas Marcel Cohen (1947) claimed he saw no evidence for internal subgroupings, numerous other scholars have made proposals, with Carsten Peust counting 27 as of 2012.

Common trends in proposals as of 2019 include using common or lacking grammatical features  to argue that Omotic was the first language to branch off, often followed by Chadic. In contrast to scholars who argue for an early split of Chadic from Afroasiatic, scholars of the Russian school tend to argue that Chadic and Egyptian are closely related. Three scholars who agree on an early split between Omotic and the other subbranches, but little else, are Harold Fleming (1983), Christopher Ehret (1995), and Lionel Bender (1997). The minority of scholars who favor an Asian origin of Afroasiatic instead tend to place Semitic as the first branch to split off. Disagreement on which features are innovative and which are inherited from Proto-Afroasiatic produces radically different trees, as can be seen by comparing the trees produced by Ehret and Igor Diakonoff.

Responding to the above, Tom Güldemann criticizes attempts at finding subgroupings based on common or lacking morphology by arguing that the presence or absence of morphological features is not a useful way of discerning subgroupings in Afroasiatic, because it can not be excluded that families currently lacking certain features did not have them in the past; this also means that the presence of morphological features cannot be taken as defining a subgroup. Peust notes that other factors that can obscure genetic relationships between languages include the poor state of present documentation and understanding of particularly language families (historically with Egyptian, presently with Omotic). Gene Gragg likewise argues that more needs to be known about Omotic still, and that Afroasiatic linguists have still not found convincing isoglosses on which to base genetic distinctions.

One way of avoiding the problem of determining which features are original and which are inherited is to use a computational methodology such as lexicostatistics, with one of the earliest attempts being Fleming 1983. This is also the method used by Alexander Militarev and Sergei Starostin to create a family tree. Fleming (2006) was a more recent attempt by Fleming, with a different result from Militarev and Starostin. Hezekiah Bacovcin and David Wilson argue that this methodology is invalid for discerning linguistic sub-relationship. They note the method's inability to detect various strong commonalities even between well-studied branches of AA.

Classification history
A relationship between Hebrew, Arabic, and Aramaic and the Berber languages was perceived as early as the 9th century CE by the Hebrew grammarian and physician Judah ibn Quraysh, who is regarded as a forerunner of Afroasiatic studies. The French orientalist Guillaume Postel had also pointed out similarities between Hebrew, Arabic, and Aramaic in 1538, and Hiob Ludolf noted similarities also to Ge'ez and Amharic in 1701. This family was formally described and named "Semitic" by August Ludwig von Schlözer in 1781. In 1844, Theodor Benfey first described the relationship between Semitic and the Egyptian language and connected both to the Berber and the Cushitic languages (which he called "Ethiopic"). In the same year T.N. Newman suggested a relationship between Semitic and the Hausa language, an idea that was taken up by early scholars of Afroasiatic. In 1855, Ernst Renan named these languages, related to Semitic but not Semitic, "Hamitic," in 1860 Carl Lottner proposed that they belonged to a single language family, and in 1876 Friedrich Müller first described them as a "Hamito-Semitic" language family. Müller assumed that there existed a distinct "Hamitic" branch of the family that consisted of Egyptian, Berber, and Cushitic. He did not include the Chadic languages, though contemporary Egyptologist Karl Richard Lepsius argued for the relation of Hausa to the Berber languages. Some scholars would continue to regard Hausa as related to the other Afroasiatic languages, but the idea was controversial: many scholars refused to admit that the largely unwritten, "Negroid" Chadic languages were in the same family as the "Caucasian" ancient civilizations of the Egyptians and Semites.

An important development in the history of Afroasiatic scholarship - and the history of African linguistics - was the creation of the "Hamitic theory" or "Hamitic hypothesis" by Lepsius, fellow Egyptologist Christian Bunsen, and linguist Christian Bleek. This theory connected the "Hamites", the originators of Hamitic languages, with (supposedly cultural superior) "Caucasians", who were assumed to have migrated into Africa and intermixed with indigenous "Negroid" Africans in ancient times. The "Hamitic theory" would serve as the basis for Carl Meinhof's highly influential classification of African languages in his book  (1912).  On the one hand, the classification of languages as "Hamitic" relied on linguistic features, such as the presence of male and female grammatical gender; thus Meinhof even split the Chadic family into "Hamito-Chadic" and unrelated non-Hamitic Chadic based on which languages possessed gender. On the other hand, the classification relied on anthropological and racial features, such as skin color, hair type, and lifestyle. In the end, Meinhof's classification included languages from every family in Africa that is recognized by modern linguistics.

Meinhof's version of the "Hamitic theory" remained prevalent until the 1940s, when it was definitively disproved by Joseph Greenberg. Earlier, the first scholar to question to existence of "Hamitic languages" was Marcel Cohen (1924), while skepticism was also expressed by A. Klingenheben and Dietrich Westermann (1920s and '30s). Greenberg rejected the Afroasiatic classification of languages that Meinhof had classified as "Hamitic" based on racial and anthropological data. Greenberg also proposed that Hausa was part of a Chadic branch of Afroasiatic, and that Afroasiatic consisted of five main branches, Berber, Chadic, Cushitic, Egyptian, and Semitic. The reluctance of some scholars to recognize Chadic as a member of Afroasiatic persisted as late as the 1980s. In 1969, Harold Fleming proposed that a group of languages classified as Cushitic by Greenberg were in fact an independent "Omotic" language family, a proposal that has been widely accepted but remains  controversial. These five or six branches remain the academic consensus on the family.

Origins

Dating of Proto-Afroasiatic
There is no consensus on when Proto-Afroasiatic was spoken.  The latest possible date for the existence of Proto-Afroasiatic is c. 4000 BCE, after which Egyptian and the Semitic languages are first attested; however, the languages must have diverged and evolved for some time before this. Consequently, scholars have offered estimates for when Proto-Afroasiatic was spoken that range between 18,000 and 8,000 BCE. It is thus the oldest proven language family. Tom Güldemann, however, argues that less time may have been required than is commonly assumed, as it is possible for a language to rapidly restructure due to language contact, as happened in the Chadic branch and probably also in Omotic.

The Proto-Afroasiatic Homeland
There is no consensus where the original homeland (Urheimat) of the first Afroasiatic speakers was located. Scholars have proposed locations both in the Middle East and in Africa. Roger Blench writes that the debate has "a strong ideological flavor", with associations between an Asian origin and "high civilization". An additional complicating factor is the lack of agreement on the subgroupings of Afroasiatic (see Subgrouping) - this makes associating archaeological evidence with the spread of Afroasiatic particularly difficult.

An African origin has broad scholarly support, and is favored by most linguists on the basis of the linguistic data. Most scholars place the homeland of Afroasiatic near the center of its current distribution, "in the southeastern Sahara or adjacent Horn of Africa." The African languages of Afroasiatic are not more closely related to each other than they are to Semitic, as one would expect if only Semitic had remained in an Asian AA homeland while all other branches had spread from there. Likewise, all Semitic languages are fairly similar to each other, whereas the African branches of Afroasiatic are very diverse; this suggests the rapid spread of Semitic out of Africa. Proponents of an African origin of Afroasiatic assume the proto-language to have been spoken by pre-Neolithic African hunter-gatherers, arguing that there is no evidence of words in Proto-Afroasiatic related to agriculture or animal husbandry. Christopher Ehret, O. Y. Keita, and Paul Newman also argue that archaeology does not indicate a spread of migrating farmers into Africa, but rather a gradual incorporation of animal husbandry into indigenous foraging cultures.

A significant minority of scholars supports an Asian origin of Afroasiatic, most of whom are specialists in Semitic or Egyptian studies. Prominent in this camp is the linguist Alexander Militarev, who argues that Proto-Afroasiatic was spoken by early agriculturalists in the Levant and subsequently spread to Africa. Militarev associates the speakers of Proto-Afroasiatic with the Levantine Post-Natufian Culture, arguing that the reconstructed lexicon of flora and fauna, as well as farming vocabulary indicates that Proto-AA must have been spoken in this area. Scholar Jared Diamond and archaeologist Peter Bellwood have taken up Militarev's arguments as part of their general argument that the spread of linguistic macrofamilies (such as Indo-European, Bantu, and Austro-Asiatic) can be associated with the development of agriculture; they argue that there is clear archaeological support for farming spreading from the Levant into Africa via the Nile valley.

Phonological characteristics

Afroasiatic languages share a number of phonetic and phonological features.

Syllable structure
Egyptian, Cushitic, Berber, Omotic, and most languages in the Semitic branch all require a syllable to begin with a consonant (with the exception of some grammatical prefixes). Igor Diakonoff argues that the requirement to begin with a vowel goes back to Proto-Afroasiatic. Some Chadic languages allow a syllable to begin with a vowel, however in many Chadic languages verbs must begin with a consonant. In Cushitic and Chadic languages, a glottal stop or glottal or fricative may be inserted to prevent a word from beginning with a vowel. Typically, syllables only begin with a single consonant.

With the exception of some Chadic languages, all AA languages allow both closed and open syllables; many Chadic languages do not allow a syllable to end in a consonant. Most words end in a vowel in Omotic and Cushitic, making syllable-final consonant clusters rare. Diakonoff argues that Proto-Afroasiatic syllables disallowed consonant clusters or vowels at the end of a syllable.

Syllable weight plays an important role in AA, especially in Chadic; it can affect the form of affixes attached to a word.

Consonant systems

Several Afroasiatic languages have large numbers of consonants, and it is likely that Proto-Afroasiatic did as well: Vladimir Orel and Olga Stolbova reconstruct 32 consonant phonemes, while Christopher Ehret reconstructs 42. Of these, about 30 are the same or have a more-or-less equivalent sound in the other reconstruction, with 12 being identical. All Afroasiatic languages contain stops and fricatives; some branches have additional types of consonants such as affricates and lateral consonants. AA languages tend to have pharyngeal fricative consonants, with Egyptian, Semitic, Berber, and Cushitic sharing ħ and ʕ. In all AA languages, consonants can be bilabial, alveolar, velar, and glottal, with additional places of articulation found in some branches or languages. Additionally, the glottal stop usually exists as a phoneme, and there tends to be no phonemic contrast between [p] and [f] or [b] and [v]. In Cushitic, the Ethiopian Semitic language Tigrinya, and some Chadic languages, there is no underlying phoneme [p] at all.

All or most branches of AA have a contrast between voiceless, voiced, and "emphatic" consonants.] and d is [], ṯ is [] and ḏ is []).}} The emphatic consonants are typically formed deeper in the throat than the others; they can be realized variously as glottalized, pharyngealized, uvularized, ejective, and/or implosive consonants in the different branches. It is generally agreed that only the obstruents had a contrast between voiceless and voiced forms in Proto-Afroasiatic, whereas continuants were voiceless.

A form of long-distance consonant assimilation known as consonant harmony is attested in Berber, Chadic, Cushitic, and Semitic: it usually affects features such as pharyngealization, palatalization, and labialization. Several Omotic languages have "sibilant harmony", meaning that all sibilants (s, sh, z, ts, etc.) in a word must match.

Consonant Incompatibilities

Restrictions against the co-occurrence of certain, usually similar, consonants in verbal roots can be found in all Afroasiatic branches, though they are only weakly attested in Chadic and Omotic. The most widespread constraint is against two different labial consonants (other than w) occurring together in a root, a constraint which can be found in all branches but Omotic. Another widespread constraint is against two non-identical lateral obstruents, which can be found in Egyptian, Chadic, Semitic, and probably Cushitic. Such rules do not always apply for nouns, numerals, or denominal verbs, and do not affect prefixes or suffixes added to the root. Roots that may have contained sequences that were possible in Proto-Afroasiatic but are disallowed in the daughter languages are assumed to have undergone consonant dissimilation or assimilation.

A set of constraints, developed originally by Joseph Greenberg on the basis of Arabic, has been claimed to be typical for Afroasiatic languages. Greenberg divided Semitic consonants into four types: "back consonants" (glottal, pharyngeal, uvular, laryngeal, and velar consonants), "front consonants" (dental or alveolar consonants), liquid consonants, and labial consonants. He showed that, generally, any consonant from one of these groups could combine with consonants from any other group, but could not be used together with consonants from the same group. Additionally, he showed that Proto-Semitic restricted a sequence of two identical consonants in the first and second position of the triliteral root. These rules also have a number of exceptions:
 velar consonants can occur with pharyngeals or laryngeals;
 dental consonants can co-occur with sibilants; However, there are no Proto-Semitic verbal roots with ḍ and a sibilant, and roots with d and a sibilant are uncommon. In all attested cases of a dental and a sibilant, the sibilant occurs in first position and the dental in second.
Similar exceptions can be demonstrated for the other AA branches that have these restrictions to their root formation. James P. Allen has demonstrated that slightly different rules apply to Egyptian: for instance, Egyptian allows two identical consonants in some roots, and disallows velars from occurring with pharyngeals.

Vowel systems
There is a large variety of vocalic systems in AA.
All branches of Afroasiatic have a limited number of underlying vowels (between two and seven), but the number of phonetic vowels can be much larger. The quality of the underlying vowels varies considerably by language; the most common vowel throughout AA is schwa. In the different languages, central vowels are often inserted to break up consonant clusters (a form of epenthesis).  Various Semitic, Cushitic, Berber, and Chadic languages, including Arabic, Amharic, Berber, Somali, and East Dangla, also exhibit various types of vowel harmony.

Attempts to reconstruct the vocalic system of Proto-Afroasiatic vary considerably. Igor M. Diakonoff proposed that Proto-AA had a three vowel system of long and short a, i, and u. Christopher Ehret proposed a five vowel system with long and short a, e, o, i, and u. Vladimir Orel and Olga Stolbova instead proposed a six vowel system with a, e, o, i, ü ([]),  and u. Ronny Meyer and H. Ekkehard Wolff instead propose that Proto-Afroasiatic may have had no vowels as such, instead employing various syllabic consonants (*l, *m, *n, *r) and semivowels or semivowel-like consonants (*w, *y, *ʔ, *ḥ, *ʕ, *h, *ʔʷ, *ḥʷ, *ʕʷ, *hʷ) to form syllables.

Tones
The majority of AA languages are tonal languages: phonemic tonality is found in Omotic, Chadic, and Cushitic languages, but absent in Berber and Semitic. There is no information on whether Egyptian had tones. In contemporary Omotic, Chadic, and Cushitic languages, tone is primarily a grammatical feature: it encodes various grammatical functions, only differentiating lexical roots in a few cases. In some Chadic and some Omotic languages every syllable has to have a tone, whereas in most Cushitic languages this is not the case.

Some scholars postulate that Proto-Afroasiatic was a tonal language, with tonality subsequently lost in some branches: Christopher Ehret has postulated a tonal system of at least two tonal phonemes, falling tone, rising tone, and possibly a third tone, level tone. Other scholars argue that Proto-AA had a pitch accent and some branches subsequently developed tone. Such scholars postulate that tones developed to compensate for lost or reduced syllables, and note that certain tones are often associated with certain syllable-final consonants.

Similarities in grammar, syntax, and morphology
At present, there is no generally accepted reconstruction of Proto-Afroasiatic grammar, syntax, or morphology, nor one for any of the sub-branches besides Egyptian. This means that it is difficult to know which features in Afroasiatic languages are retentions, and which are innovations. There are nevertheless a number of commonly observed features in Afroasiatic morphology and derivation, including, the use of suffixes, infixes, vowel lengthening and shortening as a morphological change, as well as the use of tone changes to indicate morphology. Further commonalities and differences are explored in more detail below.

Word order
It remains unclear what word order Proto-Afroasiatic had. Berber, and Egyptian, and most Semitic languages are verb-initial languages, whereas Cushitic, Omotic and some Semitic subgroups are verb-final languages. Proto-Chadic is reconstructed as having verb-initial word order, but most Chadic languages have subject-verb-object word order.

Reduplication and gemination
Afroasiatic Languages use the processes of reduplication and gemination (which often overlap in meaning) to derive nouns, verbs, adjectives, and adverbs throughout the AA language family. Gemination in particular is one of the typical features of AA. Full or partial reduplication of the verb is often used to derive forms showing repeated action (pluractionality), though it is unclear if this is an inherited feature or has been widely borrowed.

Grammatical gender and number marking
The assignment of nouns and pronouns to either masculine or feminine gender is present in all branches - but not all languages - of the Afroasiatic family. This sex-based gender system is widely agreed to derive from Proto-Afroasiatic. In most branches, gender is an inherent property of nouns. Additionally, even when nouns are not cognates, they tend to have the same gender throughout Afroasiatic ("gender stability").

A widespread pattern of gender and number marking in Afroasiatic is a consonant N for masculine, T for feminine, and N for plural. This can be found in Semitic, Egyptian, Beja, Berber, and Chadic. A system K (masculine), T (feminine), and H (plural) can be found in Cushitic, Chadic, with masculine K also appearing in Omotic. The feminine marker T is one of the most consistent aspects across the different branches of AA; in addition to deriving feminine nouns in many branches, it also functions as a diminutive, pejorative, and/or singulative marker in some languages.

Afroasiatic languages have a variety of ways of marking plurals; in some branches, nouns change gender from singular to plural (gender polarity), while in others, plural forms are ungendered. In addition to marking plurals via a number of affixes (with the suffixes -*uu/-*w and -*n(a) widely attested), several AA languages make use of internal vowel change (apophony) and/or insertion (epenthesis). These so-called "internal a" or "broken" plurals are securely attested in Semitic, Berber, Cushitic, and Chadic, although it is unclear if the Chadic examples are an independent development. Another common method of forming plurals is reduplication.

Noun cases and states

Nouns cases are found in the Semitic, Berber, Cushitic, and Omotic. They are not found in Chadic languages, and there is no evidence for cases in Egyptian. A common pattern in AA languages with case is for the nominative to marked by -u or -i, and the accusative to be marked by -a. However, the number and types of cases varies across AA and also within the individual branches. Some languages in AA have a marked nominative alignment, a feature which may date back to Proto-Afroasiatic. Zygmont Frajzyngier states that a general characteristic of case marking in AA languages is that it tends to mark roles such as genitive, dative, locative, etc. rather than the subject and object.

A second category, which partially overlaps with case, is the AA linguistic category of "state." Linguists use the term "state" to refer to different things in different languages. In Cushitic and Semitic, nouns exist in the "free state" or the "construct state". The construct state is a special, usually reduced form of a noun, which is used when the noun is possessed by another noun (Semitic) or is modified by an adjective or relative clause (Cushitic).  Edward Lipiński refers to Semitic nouns as having four states: absolute (free/indeterminate), construct, determinate, and predicate. Coptic and Egyptian grammar also refers to nouns having a "free" (absolute) state, a "construct state," and a "pronominal state." The construct state is used when a noun becomes unstressed as the first element of a compound, whereas the pronominal state is used when the noun has a suffixed possessive pronoun. Berber instead contrasts between the "free state" and the "annexed state," the latter of which is used for a variety of purposes, including for subjects placed after a verb and after certain prepositions.

M-prefix noun derivation
A prefix in m- is the most widely attested affix in AA that is used to derive nouns. It forms agent nouns, place nouns, and instrument nouns. In some branches, it can also derive abstract nouns and participles. Christopher Ehret has argued that this prefix is a later development that was not present in Proto-Afro-Asiatic, but rather derived from a PAA indefinite pronoun *m-. Such an etymology is rejected by A. Zaborski and Gábor Takács, the latter of whom argues for a PAA *ma- that unites all or some of the meanings in the modern languages.

Consonantal root structures and verbal forms
A widely attested feature in AA languages is a consonantal structure into which various vocalic "templates" are placed. This structure is particularly visible in the verbs, and is particularly noticeable in the triliteral Semitic verb.  Besides for Semitic, vocalic templates are well attested for Cushitic and Berber, where, along with Chadic, it is less productive; it is absent in Omotic. For Egyptian, evidence for the root-and-template structure exists from Coptic. In Semitic, Egyptian, Berber, verbs have no inherent vowels at all; the vowels found in a given verb are dependent on the vocalic template. In Chadic, verb stems can include an inherent vowel as well.

The degree to which the Proto-AA verbal root was triliteral (having three consonants) is debated. It may have originally been mostly biconsonantal, to which various affixes (verbal extensions) were then added and lexicalized.

As part of these templates, the alternation (apophony) between high vowels (e.g. i, u) and a low vowel (a) in verbal forms is usually described as one of the main characteristics of AA languages: this change codes a variety of different functions. It is unclear whether this system is a common AA trait; the Chadic examples, for instance, show signs of originally deriving from affixes, which could explain the origins of the alterations in other languages as well.

There is no agreement about which tenses or aspects Proto-Afroasiatic might have had. Most grammars of AA posit a distinction between perfective and imperfective verbal aspects, which can be found in Cushitic, Berber, Semitic, most Chadic languages, and some Omotic languages. The Egyptian verbal system diverges greatly from that found in the other branches.

Verbal extensions

Many AA languages use prefixes or suffixes (verbal extensions) to encode various pieces of information about the verb. Three derivational prefixes can be reconstructed for Proto-Afroasiatic: *s- 'causative', *t- 'middle voice' or 'reflexive', and *n- 'passive'. Christopher Ehret has proposed that Proto-Afroasiatic originally had as many as thirty-seven separate verbal extensions, many of which then became fossilized as third consonants. This theory has been criticized by some, such as Andrzej Zaborski and Alan Kaye, as being too many extensions to be realistic, though Zygmont Frajzyngier and Erin Shay note that some Chadic languages have as many as twelve extensions.

"Prefix conjugation"
Conjugation of verbs using prefixes that mark person, number, and gender can be found
in Semitic, Berber, and in Cushitic, where it is only found on a small set of frequent verbs. These prefixes are clearly cognate across the branches, although their use within the verbal systems of the individual languages varies. There is a general pattern in which n- is used for the first person plural, whereas t- is used for all forms of the second person regardless of plurality or gender, as well as feminine singular. Prefixes of ʔ- (glottal stop) for the first person singular and y- for the third person masculine can also be reconstructed. As there is no evidence for the "prefix conjugation" in Omotic, Chadic, or Egyptian, it is unclear whether this was a Proto-Afroasiatic feature that has been lost in those branches or is a shared innovation among Semitic, Berber, and Cushitic.

"Suffix conjugation"

Some AA branches have what is called a "suffix conjugation", formed by using pronominal suffixes to indicate person, gender, and number and a verbal adjective. In Akkadian, Egyptian, Berber, and Cushitic this forms a "stative conjugation", used to express the state or result of an action; the same endings as in Akkadian and Egyptian are also present in the West Semitic perfective verb form. In Akkadian and Egyptian, the suffixes appear to be reduced forms of the independent pronouns (see Pronouns); the obvious correspondence between the endings in the two branches has been argued to show that Egyptian and Semitic are closely related. While some scholars posit an AA origin for this form, it is possible that the Berber and Cushitic forms are independent developments, as they show significant differences from the Egyptian and Semitic forms. The Cushitic forms in particular may be derived from morphology found in subordinate clauses.

"Nisba" derivation
The so-called "Nisba" is a suffix used to derive adjectives from nouns and, in Egyptian, also from prepositions. It is found in Egyptian, Semitic, and possibly, in some relic forms, Berber. In Egyptian, it takes the forms -j, whereas in Semitic it takes the form -i(y); it thus has the same form in both language families. The Semitic genitive case in -i is probably related to "nisba" adjective derivation.

Due to its presence in the oldest attested and best-known AA branches, nisba derivation is often thought of as a "quintessentially Afroasiatic feature". Christopher Ehret argues for its presence in Proto-Afroasiatic and for its attestation in some form in all branches, with a shape -*ay in addition to -*iy in some cases.

Vocabulary comparison

Pronouns
The forms of the pronouns are very stable throughout the Afroasiatic (excluding Omotic), and they have been used as one of the chief tools for determining whether a language belongs to the family. However, there is no consensus on what the reconstructed set of Afroasiatic pronouns might have looked like. A common characteristic of AA languages is the existence of a special set of "independent" pronouns, which are distinct from subject pronouns. They can occur together with subject pronouns but cannot fulfill an object function. Also common are dependent/affix pronouns (used for direct objects and to mark possession). For most branches, the first person pronouns contain a nasal consonant (n, m), whereas the third person displays a sibilant consonant (s, sh). Other commonalities are masculine and feminine forms used in both the second and third persons, except in Cushitic and Omotic. These pronouns tend to show a masculine "u" and a feminine "i". The Omotic forms of the personal pronouns differ from the others, with only the plural forms in North Omotic appearing potentially to be cognate.

Numerals
Unlike in the Indo-European or Austronesian language families, numerals in AA languages cannot be traced to a proto-system. In the Chadic family alone, there are two different roots for "two," and Berber and Semitic likewise have two different branch-internal roots for "two". Within the Semitic language family, Lipiński counts four different roots meaning "one". Modern Chadic numeral systems are sometimes decimal, having separate names for the numbers 1-10, and sometimes base-5, deriving the numbers 6-9 from the numbers 1-5 in some way. Andrzej Zaborski further notes that the numbers "one," "two," and "five" are particularly susceptible to replacement by new words, with "five" often based on a word meaning "hand".

Another factor making comparisons of AA numeral systems difficult is the possibility of borrowing. Only some Berber languages maintain the native Berber numeral system, with many using Arabic loans for higher numbers and some from any numeral beyond two. In some Berber languages, the roots for one and two are also borrowed from Arabic. Some South Cushitic numerals are borrowed from Nilotic languages, other Cushitic numerals have been borrowed from Ethiopian Semitic languages.

The Cushitic and Chadic numeral systems appear to have originally been base 5. The system in Berber, Egyptian, and Semitic, however, has independent words for the numbers 6-9. Thus, it is possible that the numerals in Egyptian, Berber, and Semitic are more closely related, whereas the Cushitic and Chadic numerals are more closely related to each other.

Cognates

Afroasiatic languages share a vocabulary of Proto-Afroasiatic origin to varying extents. Writing in 2004, John Huehnergaard notes the great difficulty in establishing cognate sets across the family. Identifying cognates is difficult because the languages in question are often separated by thousands of years of development and many languages within the family have long been in contact with each other, raising the possibility of loanwords. Work is also hampered because of the poor state of documentation of many languages.

There are two etymological dictionaries of Afroasiatic, one by Christopher Ehret, and one by Vladimir Orel and Olga Stolbova, both from 1995. Both works provide highly divergent reconstructions and have been heavily criticized by other scholars. Andrzej Zaborski refers to Orel and Stolbova's reconstructions as "controversial", and Ehret's as "not acceptable to many scholars". Tom Güldemann argues that much comparative work in Afroasiatic suffers from not attempting first to reconstruct smaller units within the individual branches, but instead comparing words in the individual languages. Nevertheless, both dictionaries agree on some items and some proposed cognates are uncontroversial. Such cognates tend to rely on relatively simple sound correspondences.

Abbreviations: PEC='Proto-Eastern Cushtic'.

See also

 Afroasiatic phonetic notation
 Languages of Africa
 Languages of Asia
 Proto-Afroasiatic language
 Nostratic languages
 Borean languages

Notes

Citations

Works cited

External links
 Afro-Asiatic at the Linguist List MultiTree Project: Genealogical trees attributed to Delafosse 1914, Greenberg 1950–1955, Greenberg 1963, Fleming 1976, Hodge 1976, Orel & Stolbova 1995, Diakonoff 1996–1998, Ehret 1995–2000, Hayward 2000, Militarev 2005, Blench 2006, and Fleming 2006
 Afro-Asiatic and Semitic genealogical trees, presented by Alexander Militarev at his talk "Genealogical classification of Afro-Asiatic languages according to the latest data" at the conference on the 70th anniversary of V.M. Illich-Svitych, Moscow, 2004; short annotations of the talks given there 
 Root Extension And Root Formation In Semitic And Afrasian, by Alexander Militarev in "Proceedings of the Barcelona Symposium on comparative Semitic", 19-20/11/2004. Aula Orientalis 23/1-2, 2005, pp. 83–129.
 Akkadian-Egyptian lexical matches, by Alexander Militarev in "Papers on Semitic and Afroasiatic Linguistics in Honor of Gene B. Gragg." Ed. by Cynthia L. Miller. Studies in Ancient Oriental Civilization 60. Chicago: The Oriental Institute, 2007, p. 139–145.
 A comparison of Orel-Stolbova's and Ehret's Afro-Asiatic reconstructions
 "Is Omotic Afro-Asiatic?" by Rolf Theil (2006)
 Afro-Asiatic webpage of Roger Blench (with family tree).

 

Language families
Ethnic groups in Africa
Ethnic groups in Asia
Ethnic groups in Europe